A canebrake is a thick, dense growth of cane or sugarcane.

Canebrake  may also refer to:

Places in the North America
Canebrake (region of Alabama)
Canebrake, California, an unincorporated community in Kern County, California
Canebrake Ecological Reserve in Kern County, California
Canebrake Canyon, California in San Diego County, California
Canebrake (Ferriday, Louisiana), in Concordia Parish, listed on the NRHP in Louisiana
Canebrake, Mississippi, a subdivision and golf course in Lamar County, Mississippi
Canebrake, South Carolina in Greenville County, South Carolina 
Cane Brake in Edgefield County, South Carolina
Canebrake, Tennessee in Rutherford County, Tennessee
Canebrake, West Virginia in McDowell County, West Virginia
Canebreak Branch in Anson County, North Carolina
Cape Canaveral, a town in Brevard County, Florida, or "Canebrake", translated from the original Spanish Cañaveral

Animals
Canebrake groundcreeper, a species of ovenbird
Canebrake rattlesnake, a species of venomous pit viper
Canebrake tree frogs, a genus of tree frog
Canebrake wren or plain wren, a species of wren